Bryony Lavery (born 1947) is a British dramatist, known for her successful and award-winning 1998 play Frozen. In addition to her work in theatre, she has also written for television and radio. She has written books including the biography Tallulah Bankhead and The Woman Writer's Handbook, and taught playwriting at Birmingham University.

Biography
Lavery grew up in Dewsbury.

Having begun her career as an actress, she decided that she was fed up with playing poor parts in plays, such as the left arm of a sofa, and decided to write plays with better parts for women.  Early in her career she founded a theatre company called Les Oeufs Malades with actors Gerard Bell and Jessica Higgs, she also founded Female Trouble, More Female Trouble and served as artistic director of Gay Sweatshop.

Her plays have a feminist undertone in them and she has written plays (like More Light which has only one male speaking role) with almost entirely female casts. She has written more than twenty plays since 1976. She has authored translations of foreign works such as her 2007 version of Chekhov's Uncle Vanya. She has written five plays for the National Theatre Connections series. Frozen triggered a controversy and discussion about artistic sources and plagiarism and was the subject of a piece by Malcolm Gladwell published in The New Yorker and also collected in his book What the Dog Saw. In addition she also adapted Treasure Island, the novel by Robert Louis Stevenson, into a play which was first performed on the Olivier Stage of the National Theatre, London, on 3 December 2014.

She was married to a man until her early thirties, but now identifies as gay.

Selected works
 The Two Marias (1988) – Theatre Centre
 Her Aching Heart (1992)
 The Pink Paper'''s Play of the Year
 Peter Pan (1991) – a pantomime
 Goliath (1997)
 More Light (1997)  – National Theatre Connections
 Frozen (1998)
Nomination/Tony Award for Best Play
Eileen Anderson Central Television Award
TMA Best New Play Award
 The Magic Toyshop (2001)
 A Wedding Story (2000)
 Illyria (play) (2002) – NT Connections
 Last Easter (2004)
 Stockholm (2007) – Frantic Assembly
 Red Sky (2007, play) – NT Connections
 It Snows (2008, play) – NT Connections
 Breathing Underwater (1998 radio play) – BBC Radio 7
 Kursk (2009, play) – Young Vic
 Beautiful Burnout (2010) – Frantic Assembly / National Theatre of Scotland
 Dirt (2012, play) – Studio Theatre
 The Believers (2014, play) – Tricycle Theatre

 Stage adaptations 

 A Christmas Carol (by Charles Dickens, music and lyrics by Jason Carr) - Chichester Festival Theatre (2008, 2015) / Birmingham Repertory Theatre (2009, 2013) / West Yorkshire Playhouse (2010)
 Treasure Island (by Robert Louis Stevenson) - National Theatre (2014) / Birmingham Repertory Theatre (2016)
 Brighton Rock (by Graham Greene) - Pilot Theatre / York Theatre Royal / UK tour (2018)
 The Lovely Bones (by Alice Sebold) -   Royal & Derngate, Northampton / Liverpool Everyman & Playhouse / Northern Stage / Birmingham Repertory Theatre / New Wolsey Theatre (2018)
 The Midnight Gang (by David Walliams, music and lyrics by Joe Stilgoe) - Chichester Festival Theatre (2018)Swallows and Amazons (by Arthur Ransome) - Storyhouse (2018)The Book of Dust - La Belle Sauvage''  (by Philip Pullman) - Bridge Theatre (2020).

References

External links

Bryony Lavery resume ~ United Agents Agency
Bryony Lavery ~ Doollee.com 
An article by Gladwell on the Play, Plagiarization, and Intellectual Property
Bryony Lavery's radio plays 
Personal papers of Bryony Lavery held at DMU Archives

1947 births
Living people
English women dramatists and playwrights
English lesbian writers
Fellows of the Royal Society of Literature
Place of birth missing (living people)
British LGBT dramatists and playwrights
20th-century English dramatists and playwrights
20th-century English women writers
21st-century British dramatists and playwrights
21st-century English women writers
English biographers
Women biographers
Academics of the University of Birmingham
20th-century biographers
English women non-fiction writers
21st-century LGBT people